Nick Davis may refer to:

 Nick Davis (American football) (born 1979), American football player
 Nick Davis (footballer) (born 1980), Australian rules footballer
 Nick Davis (record producer), English sound engineer and record producer
 Nick Davis (television and movie producer) (born 1965), writer, director, and producer
 Nick Davis, a character on All My Children
 Nick Davis (visual effects supervisor), active in the film industry since the early 1990s
 Nick Davis, a character in 30 Minutes or Less

See also
 Nicholas Davis Jr. (1825–1875), Alabama politician
 Nick Davies (born 1953), British investigative journalist
 Nicholas Davies (disambiguation)